The RPG-30 "Kryuk" ("Hook") is a Russian hand-held disposable anti-tank grenade launcher.

History
The RPG-30 was unveiled in 2008 by the State Research and Production Enterprise, Bazalt, as a modern anti-tank grenade launcher designed to address the challenge of reactive armor and active protection systems (APS) on tanks. Active protection systems such as ARENA-E, Drozd and Trophy defeat anti-armor munitions by destroying them before they reach their target. The RPG-30 is an intended response to the introduction of these systems. The RPG-30 cleared its testing program and entered service in 2012–2013 and was immediately put on the Pentagon's list of "asymmetrical threats to the US armed forces."

2022 Russian Invasion of Ukraine
The RPG-30 has been used by the Russian military during the 2022 Russian invasion of Ukraine, with some of them being captured by the Ukrainian military.

Description
The RPG-30, like the RPG-27,  is a man-portable, disposable anti-tank rocket launcher with a single shot capacity. Unlike the RPG-27 however, there is a smaller diameter precursor round in a side tube, in addition to the main round in the main tube. The precursor round is fired shortly before the main round and acts as a decoy, tricking the target's active protection system (APS) into engaging it. The APS is not ready to engage again until 0.2–0.4 seconds later, allowing the main round time to hit the target.

The PG-30 is the main round of the RPG-30. The round is a 105 mm tandem shaped charge with a mass of 10.3 kg (22.7 lb) and has a range of 200 meters and a stated penetration capability in excess of 600 mm (24-in) of rolled homogeneous armor (RHA), 1,500 mm of reinforced concrete, 2,000 mm of brick and 3,700 mm of soil.

Defenses
In 2012 Israel Defense reported that the Rafael military-industrial corporation has developed a defense system, "Trench Coat", against the RPG-30, to supplement the existing Trophy. It consists of a 360-degree radar that detects all threats and launches 17 projectiles, of which one should strike the incoming missile.

Users

: Captured, Limited Use
: Produces a copy
  Taliban militants (during 2013-2015)
 : develops an indigenous copy, likely designated as the SCT-30

References

External links
News article announcing the RPG-30.
The Firearm Blog Diagram, photo and video.

Anti-tank rockets
Modern anti-tank rockets of Russia
Products introduced in 2012
Rocket-propelled grenade launchers
Bazalt products
Military equipment introduced in the 2010s